The thirteen Legislative Assembly of Andhra Pradesh was formed by the members elected in the 2009 Andhra Pradesh Legislative Assembly election. Election to Andhra Pradesh Legislative Assembly took place in single phase on 7th May 2014 by the Election Commission of India. Counting started officially on the morning of 16 May 2009 and the results were declared on the same day.

Members

Party-wise distribution of seats

See also

 Andhra Pradesh Legislature

Footnotes

References

External links 
 Official website of the Election Commission of India

2010s in Andhra Pradesh
Andhra Pradesh Legislative Assembly